Scandal at High Chimneys: A Victorian Melodrama is a historical mystery novel by John Dickson Carr. It was published in the US and Canada by Harper & Row in August 1959.

The story is set in London, 1865, and concerns a house called High Chimneys where secrets are hidden among the household members.

Plot introduction
Clive Strickland, lawyer and author, was to discover a bewildering and terrifying slice of Victorian life when his friend Victor Damon asked him to visit the family estate. The Damon family home, a huge and formidable mansion, plays host to a multitude of characters. Strange things happen at the Damons': a ghost like figure threatens; Matthew Damon gets murdered under impossible circumstances and it take the brilliance of Jonathan Whicher to solve the tangled puzzle.

1959 American novels
Historical mystery novels
Novels by John Dickson Carr
Fiction set in 1865
Novels set in the 1860s
Novels set in London
Hamish Hamilton books
Harper & Row books